Peeter Tammearu (born 31 July 1964 in Pärnu) is an Estonian actor.

In 1986 he graduated from the performing arts department of the Tallinn State Conservatory.

2003–2009 he was the director of Ugala Theater. Since 2014 he is an actor and director in Kuressaare Linnateater.

Selected filmography
Revolution of Pigs (2004)
August 1991 (2005)
Meeletu (2006)
Lotte from Gadgetville (2006)
Deemonid (2012)
Seenelkäik (2012)
Kertu (2013)
1944 (2015)
Truth and Justice (2019)
Lotte ja kadunud lohed (2019)
Sandra saab tööd (2021)

References

Living people
1964 births
Estonian male stage actors
Estonian theatre directors
Estonian male film actors
Estonian male television actors
Estonian Academy of Music and Theatre alumni
Recipients of the Order of the White Star, 5th Class
People from Pärnu